Asfaw (Amharic: አስፋው) is a male name of Ethiopian origin that may refer to:

Asfaw Wossen Taffari, birth name of Amha Selassie (1916–1997), the last reigning Emperor of Ethiopia
Berhane Asfaw (born 1954), Ethiopian paleontologist
Beruk Asfaw (born 1960), Ethiopian Olympic boxer
Gashaw Asfaw (born 1978), Ethiopian marathon runner
Menen Asfaw (1891–1962), wife and consort of Emperor Haile Selassie I

Amharic-language names